The 2016 COSAFA U-20 Cup will be the 23rd edition of the COSAFA U20 Cup, an international youth competition open to national associations of the COSAFA region.

In April 2016, it was announced that South Africa  would be the host nation of the competition.

The competition is open to players born on or before 1 January 1997, ensuring that all participants are also eligible for the 2017 Africa U-20 Cup of Nations.

Participants

The following teams are expected to participate:

 
 
 
  (invitee)
 
 
 
 
 
  (invitee)
 
 
 
 

The following teams rejected an invitation to compete:

 

Notes

Draw

The draw took place on 26 October 2016.

Venues

Group stage

Group A

Group B

Group C

Group D

Crossover games

Two games were played between teams from different groups as there are fewer teams in Groups B and D than A and C.

Knockout stage

Semi-finals

Third place playoff

Final

Goalscorers
63 goals were scored in 24 matches, for an average of  goals per match.
5 goals

 Luther Singh

4 goals

 Menzi Ndwandwe
 Walaa Eldin Yaqoub
 Fashion Sakala

2 goals

 Chico Banza
 Vá
 Nathan Lusuki
 Marcus Dimanche
 Sibongakonke Mbatha
 Patson Daka
 Boyd Musonda
 Chrispen Sakulanda

1 goal

 Pedro Alves
 Zinadine Catraio
 Nélson da Luz
 Said Hicham
 Habib Youssouf
 Chadrack Lukombe
 Ernest Sita
 Tseliso Botswane
 Khubetsoana Kamela
 Thabang Malane
 Alex Ferre
 Rudy Vincent
 Nilton Ernesto
 Bruno Langa
 Achmat Ceres
 Nkosingiphile Ngcobo
 Kabelo Seriba
 Itumeleng Shopane
 Sifundo Sibiya
 Hassan Hassan
 Khaled Osman
 Ammar Taifour
 Saviola Gamedze
 Ali Matse
 Bhekani Mthembu
 Edward Chilufya
 Kenneth Kalunga
 Joseph Phiri
 Bukhosi Sibanda

Own goal
 Pedro Alves (playing against the Democratic Republic of Congo)

References

U-20
2016
2016 in South African sport
International association football competitions hosted by South Africa